Dipesh Chakrabarty (born 1948, in Kolkata, India) is an Indian historian, who has also made contributions to postcolonial theory and subaltern studies. He is the Lawrence A. Kimpton Distinguished Service Professor in history at the University of Chicago, and is the recipient of the 2014 Toynbee Prize, named after Professor Arnold J. Toynbee, that recognizes social scientists for significant academic and public contributions to humanity.

Biography 
Dipesh Chakrabarty attended Presidency College of the University of Calcutta, where he received his undergraduate degree in physics. He also received a Post Graduate Diploma in Management (MBA) from Indian Institute of Management Calcutta. Later he moved on to the Australian National University in Canberra, from where he earned a PhD in history.

Chakrabarty has had an extensive program of visiting lectureships: visiting fellow, Humanities Institute, Princeton, USA (2002); Hitesranjan Sanyal Visiting Professor of History, Centre for Studies in Social Sciences, University of Calcutta (2003); visitor, Humanities Center, State University of New York, Stony Brook (2004); visiting fellow, Max Planck Institute for Historical Sciences, University of Göttingen, Germany (2005); Faculty, Seminar in Experimental Critical Theory, University of California, Irvine (2005); visiting research professor, University of Technology, Sydney (2005 and 2009); visitor, Center for Historical Studies, Jawaharlal Nehru University, Delhi (2005); scholar-in-residence, Pratt Institute, New York (2005); visiting professor, European Humanities University, Vilnius, Lithuania (2006); Ida Beam Distinguished Visiting Professor, University of Iowa (2007); distinguished visitor, Institute of Advanced Study, University of Minnesota (2007); Fellow at the Wissenschaftskolleg zu Berlin (2008–09): Katz Professor in the Humanities, University of Washington, Seattle (2009); Hallsworth Visiting Professor, University of Manchester, U.K. (2009); Institut für die Wissenschaften vom Menschen, Vienna, Austria (2010); Lansdowne Lecturer, Victoria University, Canada (2012); Nicholson Distinguished Visiting Scholar, University of Illinois, Urbana-Champaign (2013). In 2014, Chakrabarty delivered the IWM Lectures in Human Sciences in Vienna; a public lecture at Cankaya Municipality (Ankara, Turkey); Principal's Distinguished Visitor, Queen's University, Canada; distinguished visitor, Humanities Institute, Stony Brook University, New York; visitor, University of Barcelona, Spain; visiting fellow, Humanities Research Centre, College of Arts & Social Sciences, Australian National University (2014); GLASS scholar, Leiden University Institute for Area Studies (LIAS) – Humanities University of Leiden, (2015).

He also served on the Humanities jury for the Infosys Prize from 2014 to 2016.

The academic Christine Fair has accused Chakrabarty of making an inappropriate sexual comment during her time as a student in 1994. Fair also alleged that Chakrabarty made similar comments to others. The University of Chicago released a statement in 2017 inviting students to formally report such allegations. In 2021, the Graduate Employee's Organization at the University of Illinois Urbana-Champaign protested the university's decision to host Chakrabarty at a roundtable on criticism and interpretive theory, in response to Fair's allegations.

Honours

2004: Fellow of the American Academy of Arts and Sciences

2006: Honorary Fellow of the Australian Academy of the Humanities

2010: Doctor of Letters (D.Litt. (Honoris Causa)), University of London (conferred at Goldsmiths)

2011: honorary doctorate by the University of Antwerp, Belgium, in 2011; Distinguished Alumnus Award, Indian Institute of Management (IIM), Calcutta (conferred on the occasion of the fiftieth anniversary of the institute in 2011)

2014:  Toynbee Prize, named for Professor Arnold J. Toynbee, that recognizes social scientists for significant academic and public contributions to humanity

2019: Tagore Memorial Prize (Rabindra Smriti Puraskar) awarded by the Government of West Bengal, India.

Bibliography

Books
Rethinking Working Class History (1989)
Social Dimensions of Early Buddhism
Beginning of Iron and Social Changes in India: Indian Studies Past and Present
Provincializing Europe: Postcolonial Thought and Historical Difference (2000)
 Habitations of Modernity: Essays in the Wake of Subaltern Studies (2002)
 The Calling of History: Sir Jadunath Sarkar and His Empire of Truth (2015)
 The Crises of Civilization: Exploring on Global and Planetary Histories (2018)
 (With Ranajit Dasgupta) Some Aspects of Labor History of Bengal in the Nineteenth Century: Two Views (2019)
 The Climate of History in a Planetary Age (2021)

Edited volumes
 Cosmopolitanism (2002), editor with Carol Breckenridge, Sheldon Pollock, and Homi K. Bhabha
 From the Colonial to the Postcolonial: India and Pakistan in Transition (2007), editor with Rochona Majumdar and Andrew Sartori
 Historical Teleologies in the Modern World (2015), editor with Henning Trüper and Sanjay Subrahmanyam

Selected articles
"Postcoloniality and the Artifice of History: Who Speaks for 'Indian' Pasts?" Representations 37 (Winter 1992): 1–26.
"The Death of History? Historical Consciousness and the Culture of Late Capitalism." Public Culture 4.2 (Spring 1992): 47–65.
"Universalism and Belonging in the Logic of Capital." Public Culture 12.3 (Fall 2000): 653–678. 
"Where Is the Now?" Critical Inquiry 30 (Winter 2004): 458–462.
"The Climate of History: Four Theses." Critical Inquiry 35.2 (Winter 2009): 197–222.
"Postcolonial Studies and the Challenge of Climate Change." New Literary History 43.1 (Winter 2012): 1–18. 
"Climate and Capital: On Conjoined Histories." Critical Inquiry 41.1 (Autumn 2014): 1–23.
"Humanities in the Anthropocene: The Crisis of an Enduring Kantian Fable." New Literary History 47.2–3 (Spring and Summer 2016): 377–397.

Books in Bengali Language 

Itihaser Jonojibon O Onyano Probondho (2011) Ananda Publishers'' 
Monorother Thikana (2018) Anushtup 
Bondhur Chithi Bondhuke (Jointly with Raghab Bandopadhyay ) (2019) Anushtup

See also

 Partha Chatterjee
 Vivek Chibber

References

Further reading

External links

Tanner lecture 2015: Human Condition in the Anthropocene 
UChicago Faculty Page

1948 births
Bengali Hindus
Bengali writers
20th-century Bengalis
21st-century Bengalis
Bengali historians
Indian Institute of Management Calcutta alumni
Australian National University alumni
Indian writers
Indian male writers
Indian historians
Historians of South Asia
Indian academics
Indian scholars
Indian lecturers
20th-century Indian historians
21st-century Indian writers
20th-century Indian scholars
21st-century Indian scholars
21st-century Indian male writers
20th-century Indian writers
20th-century Indian male writers
Living people
University of Calcutta alumni
University of Chicago faculty
Scholars from Kolkata
People from Kolkata
West Bengal academics
Postcolonial theorists